Holcomb may refer to:

Places
In the United States:
 Holcomb, Kansas
 Holcomb, Missouri
 Holcomb, New York 
 Holcomb Creek Falls in Georgia
 Holcomb Valley near Big Bear Lake, California
 Holcomb Gardens on the Butler University campus in Indianapolis
 Holcomb Observatory and Planetarium at Butler University

Other uses
 Holcomb (surname)

See also
 Holcombe (disambiguation)
 Justice Holcomb (disambiguation)